George Henry Wright (October 26, 1849 – April 15, 1912) was a significant businessman and philanthropist in Halifax, Nova Scotia.  He was born at Wright's Cove, Nova Scotia and died in the sinking of the Titanic at the age of 62. He established Write's World Business Directory in Boston and later returned to Halifax and invested in the city.  His own house at 989 Young Ave, and two of his public buildings, the Marble Wright Building (1672 Barrington St.) and The Saint Paul Building, (1684 Barrington St., formerly the home of JW Doull's bookstore) still stand in downtown Halifax. They were all built by architect James Charles Philip Dumaresq.

He was a philanthropist who developed the first housing project in the province.  He left in his will his house to the Local Council of Women of Halifax to further the cause of women's suffrage (women's right to vote was achieved six years after Wright's death).  He also was one of the large contributors to the Y.M.C.A. building fund and Dalhousie University.

An enthusiastic yachtsman, Wright owned several boats including the sloop Princess, built by H.W. Embree and Sons in Port Hawkesbury, Nova Scotia. Wright also created the George Wright Cup, a racing trophy for sail races at the Royal Nova Scotia Yacht Squadron.

Although his body was never found, he has a grave marker in the Christ Church cemetery in Dartmouth.

Legacy 
 namesake of Wright Avenue, Halifax
 namesake of the Royal Nova Scotia Yacht Squadron's George Wright Cup.

See also 
Passengers of the RMS Titanic

References 

Endnotes

Links
  A Principled Man: a look at Halifax Titanic victim, George Wright by Jon Tattrie, March 29, 2012 
  Globe and Mail
  George Wright's Grave marker, Christ Church, Dartmouth, Nova Scotia
George Wright's Commercial Properties, Halifax, Nova Scotia
George Wright's Will

Texts
 Titanic Remembered: The Unsinkable Ship and Halifax By Alan Ruffman, p. 55-56
 True Stories from Nova Scotia's Past By Dianne Marshall
 Halifax Street Names: An Illustrated Guide By Formac Publishing Company Limited, p. 174

Canadian activists
Businesspeople from Nova Scotia

1849 births
1912 deaths
People from the Halifax Regional Municipality
Deaths on the RMS Titanic